Franziska Bertels (born 24 October 1986) is a German bobsledder who has competed since 2006.

References

External links 
 
 
 
 

1986 births
Living people
German female bobsledders
People from Schmalkalden-Meiningen
Sportspeople from Thuringia
21st-century German women